Qué! is a free weekly newspaper, published by Factoría de Información in Spain. Following the 2008 financial crisis, the newspaper decreased its circulation from being daily and distributed throughout the whole country, to being available only Fridays in Madrid.

History
Qué! was first published in 2005 and in just two years has become the free daily newspaper with the second highest readership (ahead of ADN and Metro), with a 26% share of the advertising market. It has a workforce of 240 people and is, according to a survey by Ipsos Media on the free press, the best rated free daily. On 1 August 2007, Qué! joined Grupo Vocento reinforcing its position as a popular Spanish newspaper.

Editions
The paper is based in and distributes to Madrid. Localised editions of the paper are also available in:
 Aragón
 Barcelona
 Bilbao
 Castellón
 La Rioja
 Málaga
 Oviedo
 Seville
 Valencia

References

External links
Qué!

2005 establishments in Spain
Newspapers established in 2005
Free daily newspapers
Weekly newspapers published in Spain
Spanish-language newspapers
Grupo Vocento
Newspapers published in Madrid